MDOS may refer to:

 Micropolis MDOS, an operating system for Z80 S-100 bus machines in the 1970s
 Motorola Disk Operating System for the M6800 based EXORciser development system in the 1970s
 Motorola Disk Operating System, also the underlying basis of the QDOS operating system of the Fairlight CMI digital sampling synthesizer series
 MIDAS (operating system) (originally named MDOS, and also known as M-DOS or My DOS), an 8-bit operating system for 8080/Z80, developed by Microsoft's Marc McDonald in 1979
 Myarc Disk Operating System (aka MDOS), an operating system emulating the TI-99/4A for the Geneve 9640 in 1987
 MS-DOS 4.0 (multitasking), a multitasking operating system
 Multitasking DOS sub-system in IBM OS/2, e.g. C:\OS2\MDOS\
 Multiuser DOS (aka DR MDOS), a DOS- and CP/M compatible 32-bit protected mode operating system for 386 machines developed by Digital Research / Novell in the 1990s
 Multiuser DOS Federation, an industry alliance in the 1990s

See also 
 DOS (disambiguation)
 MOS (disambiguation)
 Wordmark Systems MyDOS, an operating system for 8-bit Atari homecomputers by Wordmark Systems in the 1980s